This is a list of current and former Roman Catholic churches in the Roman Catholic Diocese of Metuchen. The diocese covers the New Jersey counties of Middlesex, Somerset, Hunterdon and Warren. The cathedral church of the diocese is the Saint Francis of Assisi Cathedral in Metuchen, New Jersey.

New Brunswick

Perth Amboy/South Amboy

Other areas

References

 
Metuchen